The 1950 Soviet Chess Championship was the 18th edition of USSR Chess Championship. Held from 10 November to 12 December 1950 in Moscow. The tournament was won by Paul Keres. Keres, Isaac Boleslavsky and Smyslov entered the final directly. The final were preceded by seven quarter-finals and five semifinals (at Leningrad, Tula, Tartu, Kiev and Gorky).

Table and results

References 

USSR Chess Championships
Championship
Chess
1950 in chess
Chess